William Herbert "Lum" York (November 16, 1918 – August 15, 2004) was a musician best known as the bass player in Hank Williams Drifting Cowboys from 1944–1949. After leaving the Drifting Cowboys, York played bass in Lefty Frizzell's band until 1953. York continued to perform until weeks before his death and was a fan favorite at the Hank Williams festival in Georgiana, Alabama.

In rural Alabama, the depression days of the 1930s and early 1940s were rough. Lum York remembers "I only had two pairs of overalls. My mother washed on Wednesdays so I had to wear them all week long."

Lum was born on November 16, 1918 as William Herbert York in the tiny hamlet of Elmore, just about 15 miles north of Montgomery, Alabama. Farming is a hard life at best. This was one of the worst times. Poverty gripped the rural south with an iron fist. To eke out a meager living, crops demanded grueling service. Lum was a schoolboy before they moved to a house with electricity. But life was more than just the backbreaking work of picking cotton and tilling the vegetable patch. On Saturday nights when the family gathered around the radio the Grand Ole Opry, Lum’s lifelong love of music was born. When he was 12, his older brother bought a guitar. Within a year, Lum had taught himself to play by listening to the radio. When his brother joined the army, Lum bought his guitar for fifty cents.

Not far away in Georgiana, Alabama, another child was born in 1923 whose life was destined to link with Lum’s in the creation of the most enduring legend country music has ever known. Hank Williams had won a talent contest at the Montgomery Empire Theater singing an original song entitled "WPA Blues" in December 1937. There was no stopping his music career from that moment. He worked local clubs and did a show on WSFA, a Montgomery radio station.

Lum had to drop out of school to help his mother after his father died. He worked with the CCC, Roosevelt’s Civilian Conservation Program to help stimulate the economy by allowing boys and young men to work on public buildings and parks for a small salary plus room and board. When Lum returned from the CCC camp, he would hitchhike into town to hear the local bands play. Since he had no money to buy a ticket, he filched eggs from his mother’s chicken house and sold them to local groceries for the admission price. He had heard Hank on the radio and began to hang around the station. They first met in 1939. The friendship remained throughout Hank’s life. The two men worked together as musicians and at various shipyards when the money from the beloved music wasn’t enough to make ends meet.

In 1944 Lum and his big bass fiddle joined Hank’s band, The Drifting Cowboys. Lum told of the first time he played music with Hank, "We had got to be friends working together in the shipyard. One night I went where he was playing. I had bought a bass and was learning to play it. I was also friends with the guy who was playing bass that night and he asked me to sit in while he went to the bathroom. Hank and Audrey were dancing while I played the set. When the music ended, Hank asked me ‘You want a job playing with the band?’ I told him, ‘Hank, I don’t know how to play too good.’ He said, ‘You want to learn? I’ll pay you $20 a week and room and board.’"

Until 1948, Lum drove around the South with Hank and the band. Sometimes there was only one other member, the trumpet player. Occasionally Hank’s family joined them. Lycrecia, Hank’s stepdaughter, who was about five or six then, recalled those times in a letter to Lum." You were like a big brother to me. You were the one that played games with me, taught me to tell time when I was traveling from one town to another. You made me laugh; you were my best friend. When I think back about how I used to sit on your lap when we were traveling to the shows because there wasn’t anywhere for me to sit with the big bass fiddle running down the middle of the car, I have to laugh. We were so crowded in that car! Then when it would get late and I got sleepy, Mom would put me in your fiddle case backstage."

As Hank’s popularity and his income increased, he acquired a tiny trailer to pull around to shows. Audrey sometimes joined them then and they were treated to "home cooked" meals. It also gave them a place to lie down and rest between the shows.

During this time, Lillie, Hank’s mother often traveled with them and managed a "junior band" which would play in the same area as Hank’s band. One of the members of this band, on hearing Lum’s strong southern accent, nicknamed him "Lum". The name was taken from a popular radio show comedy duet called "Lum and Abner." The name stuck.

Since Hank couldn’t smoke when he was singing he liked Lum to stand next to him to play. Lum would light up a cigarette, take a draw, and start playing, then Hank would take the cigarette and finish it. Lum commented, "I was lighting a half a pack of cigs a night and hardly getting a smoke. I told Hank to leave my cigs alone, but as usual, he did the same thing and I kicked his hand. He went ahead and smoked it and grinned. However, I don’t recall him smoking another one of my cigs."

Being young, attractive and somewhat wild, Hank was a big attraction to the ladies. At one show in a small honky tonk on the edge of Montgomery, Hank and Lum were playing to just two couples. Hank spoke to the woman who worked the bar and she in turn spoke to one of the women at the table. Soon, the two men at the table went to the rest room. Lum recalls Hank telling him "let's go" and they hurried out to the car. The two women were lying down on the car seats. At the first red light, Lum jumped out and told Hank, "You can get shot if you want to but I’m going home." He never heard any more about the incident.

Lum often played peacemaker in the Williams’ stormy marriage. After a squabble, Hank would have Lum go talk to Audrey. He had fond memories of visiting Audrey and playing with young Hank Williams, Jr. The two men also collaborated on writing songs. Lum wrote the chorus and title of "Take this Message to My Mother" and Hank wrote the verses.

Lum was also the unwitting inspiration for Hank’s "I Saw the Light" Hank, Audrey and the band, six people altogether, were crammed into a 1942 Chevy. As you can imagine, it was hard for any of them to rest comfortably. Lum raised up to change positions. He looked out the window and as he lay back down, he stated "We’re getting close to Montgomery. I saw the light." Referring to a beacon light near town that was always a landmark for the band as they returned home from shows.

Hank  mumbled that it was a good title for a song and by the next day when the band gathered for their show on WSFA, he was picking out the tune to "I saw the Light". Many versions about the origin of this song have been advanced over the years but Lum felt that this is the truest.

It was around this time that Hank suggested to Lum he might be good as a comedian. Lum stated, "That’s one big difference between country music now and then. Those days, every band carried a comedian. Today they don’t do that. But young people still like to hear jokes and stuff."

After the first night, Hank told Lum he didn’t think the comedy would work but Lum decided to make it work. He put on an outrageous country bumpkin outfit, wore a wig, painted freckles on his face and used every joke he could beg borrow or steal. It was an unqualified hit, especially with the children in the audience.

I asked him to tell some of his favorite jokes. He said, "One night everyone was going to a party. Said they had a real good time drinking mixed drinks. I went home and mixed one to see how I liked it. I mixed up some Milk of Magnesia with vodka. I call it a Phillips screwdriver."

When Hank went to the Louisiana Hayride in 1948, Lum was the only player from Montgomery to go with him. "One thing about Hank, he never closed any of his shows without singing a hymn. There was always complete reverence with him and the band members at this time. Another thing, he never turned his back on the audience. He always stood facing or to the side."

When Hank went to the Opry in 1949, they required him to use the house band on stage. Lum remained behind and played with the staff band on the Hayride then for Bill Monroe for a while. He began playing with Lefty Frizzell and was on the road when he learned of Hank’s death. When asked about that time Lum replied, "I was playing with Lefty (Frizzell) then and we were playing San Antonio, Texas. We were off for a few days and I had gone to Baton Rouge, Louisiana but had to return to San Antonio the next day. Mrs. Williams called my mother trying to find me but they didn’t know where I was. She wanted me to be a pall bearer but I had to go back to work, I couldn’t let Lefty down and we had to play in Texas."

Regarding the ‘New Country,’ Lum had this to say. "I think if Hank was still alive today, he would be doing the same thing that he was doing back then. He loved his country music and the country style. I know he would not like this so called modern country music period."

Lum played with George Morgan, Goldie Hill, Marty Robbins and other Nashville greats for several years. He returned to Baton Rouge, Louisiana and married Juanita (Nita) Kelly in 1954. (He was married before, for a brief time in the early 50s, to Aline Coates Gibson, also of Baton Rouge.)  As a married man, he needed a bit more stability than the music world offered so he went to work for the Louisiana School Board. Of course, he always played his music on the weekends.

Over the years, Lum played with Tennessee Ernie Ford, Hank Thompson, Kitty Wells, Johnny and Jack, Webb Pierce, Slim Whitman, Jimmie Davis and countless other country music greats. At heart, he always remained what he was originally, a plain Southern farm boy.

When asked about his biggest regret in life, Lum told me, "on October 2, 1952 Hank Williams made his last appearance in Baton Rouge, Louisiana I played on the show with him and then later that night he asked me to rejoin his band and play comedian. I told him I would call him back. It was a number at a hotel. I called him back and told him I was going to stay with Lefty. I always regretted that." He performed almost until his death. As he could no longer play the fiddle due to a heart condition, he played the spoons.

Before his death, Lum had created two tapes, "My Life and Times with Hank Williams" and "Memories are Forever." He retired from the school board and lived quietly with his wife until his death in 2004. His biggest pleasure in life was playing with their grandbaby, Kirby Camille Lastrapes.

Lum York died in Baton Rouge, Louisiana on 8-15-2004 at age 85. He was buried in the cemetery, Green Oaks Memorial Park.

External links 
 Additional images of Lum, Hank Williams and the Drifting Cowboys Band
 

1918 births
2004 deaths
People from Butler County, Alabama
American double-bassists
Male double-bassists
20th-century American musicians
20th-century double-bassists
20th-century American male musicians
Drifting Cowboys members